Jamie Foy (born June 14, 1996) is a regular-footed American skateboarder. Foy was crowned 2017 Skater of the Year by Thrasher magazine. He is part of the New Balance Numeric skateboarding team.

Career
Foy was born and grew up in Deerfield Beach, Florida.  He started skating at a young age, entering local skate contests as young as four years old.  Foy started his career in 2013 and won several competitions in Florida, Georgia, and Pennsylvania.

In 2016, Foy moved to Los Angeles and quickly gained popularity after appearing in 7 videos in 2016 and 2017.  In 2017, he became pro for Deathwish Skateboards and was invited to join the Street League Tour.  He was named Thrasher's Skater of the Year the same year.

Foy has won a total of three X Games medals in 2019 and 2021.

References

External links 
 The Nine Club - Podcast 31- guest: Jamie Foy

1996 births
American skateboarders
Living people
People from Deerfield Beach, Florida
Sportspeople from Broward County, Florida